The Sassanid Palace at Sarvestan ( kakh-eh Sassani-ye Sarvestan) is a Sassanid-era building in the Iranian city of Sarvestan, some 90 km southeast from the city of Shiraz. The palace was built in the 5th century AD, and was either a gubernatorial residence or a Zoroastrian fire temple.

History
The Sarvestan Palace was built by the Sasanian king Bahramgur (r. 420–438), and dominates an immense, empty plain. The name "palace" is a bit misleading, because the monument's function is not really understood. It may in fact have been a hunting lodge or even a sanctuary. The problem is complicated by the fact that there appears to have been a small building, just north of the palace; its function is unknown.

Palace court
A visitor who would have arrived from the south, would have seen three iwans. After entering the central one, he would have reached a large square hall under a large dome, made of baked brick. After this, a visitor would have found himself on a rectangular courtyard, surrounded by the residential quarters. The building reminds one of the Ghal'eh Dokhtar and the palace of Ardashir, both near Firuzabad; the difference is that the Sarvestan palace is open to all sides. The building, made of stone and mortar, must have had fine decorations, which partly survive.

See also
 Iranian architecture
 History of Persian domes

References

 J Homayooni (1996), History of Sarvestan.

Architecture in Iran
Sarvestan
Castles in Iran
Sasanian castles
Buildings and structures in Fars Province
Historic buildings and structures in Iran
Sasanian palaces